This is a comprehensive chronological list of governors of Chernigov Governorate.

Governors 
Governors were the chairmen of the regional executive committees.
Sofia Sokolovska January 19, 1918 - March 12, 1918
Ukrainian State
Yuri Lapchynsky January 10, 1919 - April 13, 1919 as chairman of revkom
Yuri Kotsyubynsky April 1919 - October 28, 1919
Nikolai Avilov-Glebov October 28, 1919 - 1919 as chairman of revkom
Danylo Petrovsky 1919 - 1920
Tit Korzhykov May 5, 1920 - July 12, 1920 as chairman of revkom
Tit Korzhykov July 12, 1920 - 1920
Nikolai Filatov 1920
Sergei Buzdalin September 7, 1920 - October 6, 1920 as chairman of revkom
Panas Lyubchenko 1921
Mykola Pakhomov 1921 - 1922
Ivan Popov December 1922 - June 1924
Stepan Vlasenko 1924 - ?

Regional Communist party leaders
Andrian Ryndich January 1919 - 1919
Yuri Kotsyubynsky August 1919 - 1919
Ivan Batyuk-Urusov 1919 - 1920
Yakov Chubin 1920
Andrian Ryndich 1920
Fyodor Kremenitsky 1920 - 1921
Oleksandr Odyntsov 1921
Mark Tyomkin 1921
Savva Taran 1924 - 1925

Chekists and Chief of GPU
Nikolai Gargayev October 1918 - January 1919
S.Levchuk January 1919 - March 1919
Nikolai Gargayev March 1919 - July 1919
A.Rak July 1919 - August 1919
Davs Rinkmanis August 1919 - October 1919 (also known as Pyotr Karpenko)
Oleksandr Odyntsov October 1919 - November 1919
Semyon Volsky November 1919 - January 1920
Zarnitsyn January 1920 - February 1920
P.Myshkin February 1920 - March 1920
V.Abramov March 1920 - August 1920
Yakov Lifshyts August 1920 - February 1921
Janis Biksons February 1921 - January 1922
Saveliy Tsyklis January 1922 - July 1923
Abram Rosenbardt July 1923 - September 22, 1923 (also known as Aleksandr Rozanov)
Vasiliy Zaborenko September 1923 - 1925

See also
Chernigov Governorate

References

External links
 Leaders of Chernigov Governorate during the Russian Civil War

Chernigov Governorate
Politics of the Russian Empire